Karma Mobility, Inc. is a wireless internet site that operates on Sprint's 4G LTE Network The company sells hardware and data to customers via pre-paid products and monthly subscriptions, currently headquartered in Irving, Texas. The company was founded in 2012 through Techstars.

Services 
In December 2012, Karma launched its wireless Internet services in the United States through wholesale Internet carrier Clearwire. The services are available for both free and paid subscriptions, and are accessed via a mobile broadband modem. Karma also offers a hotspot feature, allowing subscribers to share their network connection with others.

Controversy 
Karma became a center of controversy in January 2016, over changing their Neverstop plan and cutting customer's data multiple times. Some customers accused the company of using bait and switch tactics. Newer customers were offered a refund for their devices, based on Karma's standard 45–day return policy. However, customers who purchased Karma "Go" hotspots with Neverstop, outside of that standard return period, were explicitly told "no refunds".  Many customers also report not receiving refunds even within the standard return period.

Karma offered a program called "Neverstop" where users got unlimited data at up to 5 Mbit/s for $50 a month. After 2 months, Karma blamed customers for "misuse" of the unlimited data service and began throttling users speeds from 5 Mbit/s to 1 Mbit/s. After over a week of throttled speeds, Karma decided to change the "Neverstop" program from unlimited to 15 GB for the same $50 price. Karma's website stated that they would give users 30 days notice if any changes occur. However, their users were given no warning for the sudden change from unlimited 5 Mbit/s to throttled 1.5 Mbit/s and then to a data cap of 15 GB.  After just one month, the "Neverstop" service changed again and this time Karma decided to use a new program called "Pulse". Neverstop ended and Pulse became the new service for Karma users.

Network 
Karma's first generation ran on Sprint's WiMax network which shut down in November 2015. Their second generation, Karma Go, runs on Sprint's 4G LTE network. Karma encountered some issues adapting to Sprint's LTE network. However, after a long waiting period, they were able to fully convert over to the Sprint network. As of 2016, Karma has had to change a lot of their services due to high data usage from customers. Karma buys mass bulk data from Sprint and thus, currently cannot support unlimited plans. Karma has updated its services to stay on the Sprint network, and Karma and Sprint still maintain a relationship as of 2016.

References

External links 
 

Internet service providers of the United States
American companies established in 2012
Software companies established in 2012
Telecommunications companies established in 2012